Aye Lwin is a Burmese politician who currently serves as a member of Pyithu Hluttaw. He is a colonel in the Burmese military.

Early life and education 
Aye Lwin was born on 14 September  1970 in Thazi, Myanmar. He graduated Bachelor of Arts in History from Mawlamyine University.

Political career 
He is a colonel in the Burmese military. He was elected as a Pyithu Hluttaw MP elected representative from the military at the 2015 Myanmar general election.

References

1970 births
Living people